Edward Robert Lytton Bulwer-Lytton, 1st Earl of Lytton,  (8 November 183124 November 1891) was an English statesman, Conservative politician and poet who used the pseudonym Owen Meredith. He served as Viceroy of India between 1876 and 1880during his tenure, Queen Victoria was proclaimed Empress of Indiaand as British Ambassador to France from 1887 to 1891.

His tenure as Viceroy was controversial for its ruthlessness in both domestic and foreign affairs, especially for his handling of the Great Famine of 1876–78 and the Second Anglo-Afghan War. His policies were alleged to be informed by his Social Darwinism. His son Victor Bulwer-Lytton, 2nd Earl of Lytton, who was born in India, later served as Governor of Bengal and briefly as acting Viceroy.  The senior earl was also the father-in-law of the architect Sir Edwin Lutyens, who designed New Delhi.

Lytton was a protégé of Benjamin Disraeli in domestic affairs, and of Richard Lyons, 1st Viscount Lyons, who was his predecessor as Ambassador to France, in foreign affairs. His tenure as Ambassador to Paris was successful, and Lytton was afforded the rare tribute – especially for an Englishman – of a French state funeral in Paris.

Childhood and education

Lytton was the son of the novelists Edward Bulwer-Lytton, 1st Baron Lytton and Rosina Doyle Wheeler (who was the daughter of the early women's rights advocate Anna Wheeler). His uncle was Sir Henry Bulwer. His childhood was spoiled by the altercations of his parents, who separated acrimoniously when he was a boy. However, Lytton received the patronage of John Forster – an influential friend of Leigh Hunt, Charles Lamb, Walter Savage Landor, and Charles Dickens – who was generally considered to be the first professional biographer of 19th century England.

Lytton's mother, who lost access to her children, satirised his father in her 1839 novel Cheveley, or the Man of Honour. His father subsequently had his mother placed under restraint, as a consequence of an assertion of her insanity, which provoked public outcry and her liberation a few weeks later. His mother chronicled this episode in her memoirs.

After being taught at home for a while, he was educated in schools in Twickenham and Brighton and thence Harrow, and at the University of Bonn.

Diplomatic career
Lytton entered the Diplomatic Service in 1849, when aged 18, when he was appointed as attaché to his uncle, Sir Henry Bulwer, who was Minister at Washington, DC. It was at this time he met Henry Clay and Daniel Webster. He began his salaried diplomatic career in 1852 as an attaché to Florence, and subsequently served in Paris, in 1854, and in The Hague, in 1856 . In 1858, he served in St Petersburg, Constantinople, and Vienna. In 1860, he was appointed British Consul General at Belgrade.

In 1862, Lytton was promoted to Second Secretary in Vienna, but his success in Belgrade made Lord Russell appoint him, in 1863, as Secretary of the Legation at Copenhagen, during his tenure as which he twice acted as Chargé d'Affaires in the Schleswig-Holstein conflict. In 1864, Lytton was transferred to the Greek court to advise the young Danish Prince. In 1865, he served in Lisbon, where he concluded a major commercial treaty with Portugal, and subsequently in Madrid. He subsequently became Secretary to the Embassy at Vienna and, in 1872, to Richard Lyons, 1st Viscount Lyons, who was Ambassador to Paris. By 1874, Lytton was appointed British Minister Plenipotentiary at Lisbon where he remained until being appointed Governor General and Viceroy of India in 1876.

Viceroy of India (1876–1880)

Midway on his journey [to India] he met, by prearrangement, in Egypt, the Prince of Wales, then returning from his tour through India. Immediately on his arrival in Calcutta he was sworn in as Governor General and Viceroy, and on 1 January 1877, surrounded by all the Princes of Hindustan, he presided at a spectacular ceremony on the plains of Delhi, which marked the Proclamation of her Majesty, Queen Victoria, as Empress of India. After this the Queen conferred upon him the honor of the Grand Cross of the civil division of the Order of the Bath. In 1879 an attempt was made to assassinate Lord Lytton, but he escaped uninjured. The principal event of his viceroyalty was the Afghan war. (The New York Times, 1891)

After turning down an appointment as governor of Madras, Lytton was appointed Viceroy of India in 1875 and served from 1876 to 1880. His tenure was controversial for its ruthlessness in both domestic and foreign affairs. In 1877, Lord Lytton convened a durbar (imperial assembly) in Delhi that was attended by around 84,000 people, including Indian princes and noblemen. In 1878, he implemented the Vernacular Press Act, which enabled the Viceroy to confiscate the press and paper of any Indian Vernacular newspaper that published content that the Government deemed to be "seditious", in response to which there was a public protest in Calcutta that was led by the Indian Association and Surendranath Banerjee.

Lytton's son-in-law, Sir Edwin Lutyens, planned and designed New Delhi.

Indian famine

Lord Lytton began serving Viceroy of India in 1876. The rains had been failing in parts of the Madras Presidency since 1875, and the colonial administration's poor response to the famine has been held by some as having contributed to the overall death toll of between 6.1 million and 10.3 million.

Lord Lytton's implementation of the relief efforts of the colonial administration has also been has been blamed for increasing the severity of the famine.

Second Anglo-Afghan War, 1878–1880

Britain was deeply concerned throughout the 1870s about Russian attempts to increase its influence in Afghanistan, which provided a Central Asian buffer state between the Russian Empire and British India. Lytton had been given express instructions to recover the friendship of the Amir of Afghanistan, Sher Ali Khan, who was perceived at this point to have sided with Russia against Britain, and made every effort to do so for eighteen months. In September 1878, Lytton sent General Sir Neville Bowles Chamberlain as an emissary to Afghanistan, but he was refused entry. Considering himself left with no real alternative, in November 1878, Lytton ordered an invasion which sparked the Second Anglo-Afghan War. The British won virtually all the major battles of this war, and in the final settlement, the Treaty of Gandamak, saw a government installed under a new amir which was both by personality and law receptive to British demands; however, the human and material costs of the conflict provoked extensive controversy, particularly among the nascent Indian press, which questioned why Lytton spent so much money prosecuting the conflict with Afghanistan instead of focusing on famine relief. This, along with the massacre of British diplomat Sir Louis Cavagnari and his staff by mutinying Afghan soldiers, contributed to the defeat of Disraeli's Conservative government by Gladstone's Liberals in 1880.

The war was seen at the time as an ignominious but barely acceptable end to the "Great Game", closing a long chapter of conflict with the Russian Empire without even a proxy engagement. The pyrrhic victory of British arms in India was a quiet embarrassment which played a small but critical role in the nascent scramble for Africa; in this way, Lytton and his war helped shape the contours of the 20th century in dramatic and unexpected ways. Lytton resigned at the same time as the Conservative government. He was the last Viceroy of India to govern an open frontier.

Commemoration
A permanent exhibition in Knebworth House, Hertfordshire, is dedicated to his diplomatic service in India. There is a monument dedicated in his name at Nahan, Himachal Pradesh, India domestically called Delhi Gate.

Domestic politics
In 1880, Lytton resigned his Viceroyalty at the same time that Benjamin Disraeli resigned the premiership. Lytton was created Earl of Lytton, in the County of Derby, and Viscount Knebworth, of Knebworth in the County of Hertford. On 10 January 1881, Lytton made his maiden speech in the House of Lords, in which he censured in Gladstone's devolutionist Afghan policy. In the summer session of 1881, Lytton joined others in opposing Gladstone's second Irish Land Bill. As soon as the summer session was over, he undertook "a solitary ramble about the country". He visited Oxford for the first time, went for a trip on the Thames, and then revisited the hydropathic establishment at Malvern, where he had been with his father as a boy". He saw this as an antidote to the otherwise indulgent lifestyle that came with his career, and used his sojourn there to undertake a critique of a new volume of poetry by his friend Wilfrid Blunt.

Ambassador to Paris: 1887–1891
Lytton was Ambassador to France from 1887 to 1891. During the second half of the 1880s, before his appointment as Ambassador in 1887, Lytton served as Secretary to the Ambassador to Paris, Lord Lyons. He succeeded Lyons, as Ambassador, subsequent to the resignation of Lyons in 1887. Lytton had previously expressed an interest in the post and enjoyed himself "once more back in his old profession".

Lord Lytton died in Paris on 24 November 1891, where he was given the rare honour of a state funeral. His body was then brought back for interment in the private family mausoleum in Knebworth Park.

There is also a memorial to him in St Paul's Cathedral, London.

Writings as "Owen Meredith"

When Lytton was twenty-five years old, he published in London a volume of poems under the name of Owen Meredith. He went on to publish several other volumes under the same name. The most popular is Lucile, a story in verse published in 1860. His poetry was extremely popular and critically commended in his own day. He was a great experimenter with form. His best work is beautiful, and much of it is of a melancholy nature, as this short extract from a poem called "A Soul's Loss" shows, where the poet bids farewell to a lover who has betrayed him:

Lytton underesteemed his poetic ability: in his Chronicles and Characters (1868), the poor response to which distressed him, Lytton states, 'Talk not of genius baffled. Genius is master of man./Genius does what it must, and Talent does what it can'. However, Lytton's poetic ability was highly esteemed by other literary personalities of the day, and Oscar Wilde dedicated his play Lady Windermere's Fan to him.

Lytton's publications included:
 Clytemnestra, The Earl's Return, The Artist and Other Poems (1855)
 The Wanderer (1859), a Byron-esque lyric of Continental adventures that was popular on its release
 Lucile (1860). Lytton was accused of plagiarizing George Sand's novel Lavinia for the story.
 Serbski Pesme (1861). Plagiarized from a French translation of Serbian poems.
 The Ring of Ainasis (1863)
 Fables in Song (1874)
 Speeches of Edward Lord Lytton with some of his Political Writings, Hitherto unpublished, and a Prefactory Memoir by His Son (1874)
 The Life Letters and Literary Remains of Edward Bulwer, Lord Lytton (1883)
 Glenaveril (1885)
 After Paradise, or Legends of Exile (1887)
 King Poppy: A Story Without End (partially composed in early 1870s: only first published in 1892), an allegorical romance in blank verse that was Lytton's favourite of his verse romances

Based on the French translation, in 1868 he published a drama titled Orval, or the Fool of Time which has been inspired by Krasiński's The Undivine Comedy to the point it has been discussed in scholarly literature as an example of a "rough translation", paraphrase or even  plagiarism.

Further reading
There is a detailed biography of Lytton by A. B. Harlan (1946).

Marriage and children

On 4 October 1864 Lytton married Edith Villiers. She was the daughter of Edward Ernest Villiers (1806–1843) and Elizabeth Charlotte Liddell and the granddaughter of George Villiers.

They had at least seven children:
 Edward Rowland John Bulwer-Lytton (1865–1871)
 Lady Elizabeth Edith "Betty" Bulwer-Lytton (1867–1942). Married Gerald Balfour, 2nd Earl of Balfour, brother of Prime Minister Arthur Balfour.
 Lady Constance Georgina Bulwer-Lytton (1869–1923)
 Hon. Henry Meredith Edward Bulwer-Lytton (1872–1874)
 Lady Emily Bulwer-Lytton (1874–1964). Married Edwin Lutyens. Associate of Krishnamurti
 Victor Bulwer-Lytton, 2nd Earl of Lytton (1876–1947)
 Neville Bulwer-Lytton, 3rd Earl of Lytton (1879–1951)

References

External links

 
 
 
 
 The LUCILE Project an academic effort to recover the publishing history of Lucile (which went through at least 2000 editions by nearly 100 publishers).
 His profile in ancestry.com

|-

1831 births
1891 deaths
19th-century English nobility
Viceroys of India
1870s in British India
1880s in British India
Ambassadors of the United Kingdom to France
Ambassadors of the United Kingdom to Portugal
People educated at Harrow School
Diplomatic peers
101
Knights Grand Cross of the Order of the Bath
Knights Grand Commander of the Order of the Star of India
Knights Grand Commander of the Order of the Indian Empire
Members of the Privy Council of the United Kingdom
University of Bonn alumni
Rectors of the University of Glasgow
Burials at Knebworth
Robert
Eldest sons of British hereditary barons
Edward Bulwer-Lytton
Peers of the United Kingdom created by Queen Victoria